State Route 98 (SR 98) is a north–south state highway in the northern portion of the U.S. state of Ohio. Its southern terminus is at the SR 47/SR 423 concurrency in Waldo, and its northern terminus is at SR 61 in Plymouth.

SR 98 is known as Columbus-Sandusky Road along its stretch between Waldo and Bucyrus, as well as Bucyrus Street in Plymouth.  This stretch of SR 98, in combination with US 23 south of Waldo, and SR 4 north of Bucyrus, comprises the most direct route between Columbus and Sandusky.

History
SR 98 was commissioned in 1923 on the same alignment as today. The entire route was paved by 1933.

Major intersections

References

External links

098
Transportation in Marion County, Ohio
Transportation in Crawford County, Ohio
Transportation in Richland County, Ohio